Scotland is an unincorporated community in Gadsden County, Florida, United States. It is located south of Havana at the intersection of County Roads 159 and 270.

References

Unincorporated communities in Gadsden County, Florida
Tallahassee metropolitan area
Unincorporated communities in Florida